Vodapiuez is a surname. Notable people with the surname include:

Janez Vodapiuez (died 1608), Slovenian politician
Mihael Vodapiuez, 16th-century Slovenian politician